The 2011 Samsung Mobile 500 NASCAR race was held on April 9, 2011, at Texas Motor Speedway in Fort Worth, Texas. It was the first spring night race for Texas Motor Speedway in its 15-year history of hosting NASCAR races and was the seventh race in the 2011 Sprint Cup season.

Matt Kenseth won the race for Roush Fenway Racing, ending a 76-race winless streak. There was only 1 major wreck, involving Martin Truex Jr., Mark Martin, and Regan Smith. David Starr made his Cup debut in the race.

References

Samsung Mobile 500
Samsung Mobile 500
2010s in Fort Worth, Texas
NASCAR races at Texas Motor Speedway